Eucalyptus umbrawarrensis, commonly known as the Umbrawarra gum, is a small to medium-sized tree that is endemic to the Northern Territory. It has smooth, powdery white bark, narrow lance-shaped adult leaves, flower buds in groups of seven, white flowers and cup-shaped to barrel-shaped fruit.

Description
It has smooth powdery white bark, that is pale yellow to pale pink when new. Flowering has been observed in January and October and the flowers are white.

Taxonomy and naming
Eucalyptus umbrawarrensis was first formally described in 1922 by Joseph Maiden in his book, A Critical Revision of the Genus Eucalyptus from specimens collected by Harald Jensen in 1916 in Umbrawarra Gorge. The specific epithet (umbrawarrensis) refers to the type location.

Distribution and habitat
Umbrawarra gum grows in open woodland on ridges, hills and tablelands in the Top End and Victoria River districts of the Northern Territory.

Conservation status
This eucalypt is classified as "least concern" under the Northern Territory Government ''Territory Parks and Wildlife Conservation Act.

See also
List of Eucalyptus species

References

Trees of Australia
umbrawarrensis
Myrtales of Australia
Flora of the Northern Territory
Plants described in 1922